Arben Shehu (born 1967) is a former Albanian football striker who played for Luftëtari Gjirokastër, Teuta Durres and Bylis Ballsh.

Club career
He was the top goalscorer in the Albanian Superliga for the 1994–1995 season with 21 goals in 28 games for newly promoted Shqiponja Gjirokastër, after topping the Albanian First Division's goalscoring charts a season earlier.

Personal life
Shehu works as a sports inspector in Memaliaj Municipality and is technical director at local club KF Memaliaj.

References

1967 births
Living people
Association football forwards
Albanian footballers
Luftëtari Gjirokastër players
KF Teuta Durrës players
FK Tomori Berat players
KF Bylis Ballsh players
Kategoria Superiore players
Kategoria e Parë players